Cassida stevensi is a species of leaf beetle, situated in the subfamily Cassidinae (tortoise beetles) and the genus Cassida. It was described as a new species in 2011 from specimens collected in India and Myanmar.

References

Cassidinae
Beetles of Asia
Beetles described in 2011